Clint is both a given name and a surname.

Clint may also refer to:

Places
Clint, North Yorkshire, a village in England
Clint, Texas, a town in the United States

Fictional characters
Clint Barton, a superhero in American comic books published by Marvel Comics
Clint, a playable character in the mobile game Mobile Legends: Bang Bang

Other uses
CLiNT, a UK comic edited by Mark Millar
Clint, a feature of Limestone pavements
Clint (film), a 2017 Malayalam-language Indian biographical film